NDLS is an acronym that may stand for:

 Notre Dame Law School
 The code for the New Delhi Railway Station, India
 Nederlands, acronym used for Dutch language in Belgium
 National Dock Labour Scheme; see National Dock Labour Board

See also
 NDL (disambiguation)